Campfire Tales is a 1997 American anthology horror film directed by Matt Cooper, Martin Kunert, and David Semel. The film is made up of three individual short segments that are presented in an overarching narrative, told by a group of friends around a fire after they crash their car in the woods. It stars James Marsden, Christine Taylor, Amy Smart, and Ron Livingston.

Plot
In the 1950s, Jenny and Eddie are kissing in a car at a viewpoint. Jenny becomes nervous that someone is watching them after they hear a radio broadcast of a madman on the loose in the area. She forces Eddie to drive them back to town, thinking she sees someone lurking in the woods. They arrive at a drive-in, and Eddie walks to the window to order a milkshake. When he returns toward the car, he sees a hook hanging from the car's passenger door.

In the present day, Cliff, his girlfriend Lauren, and her little brother Eric and friend Alex are driving home from a concert. Cliff, drunk and driving erratically, crashes the car in the woods. They light flares and discover an abandoned church foundation nearby, where they start a fire. To pass the time, they begin telling a series of campfire tales.

In the first story, Rick and Valerie are on their honeymoon driving through Nevada. They take a detour to visit caverns, and park their RV in a rural area. They are disturbed by a local man who warns them not to spend the night there, insisting they park elsewhere. They ignore him and park a little further up, still in the rural area. The local is attacked by unseen creatures and brutally killed. As they have sex in the RV, a creature watches through the window. Valerie sprains her ankle and Rick leaves to walk to a gas station nearby, even though he had recently filled their tank up. On his way to the service station, Rick stumbles upon the body of the local man and he too is attacked. Rick gets choked, damaging his vocal chords, making it difficult for him to speak. He runs back to the RV but Valerie doesn’t recognize his knock. Valerie is attacked through the sunroof of the RV and terrorized by the creature. She pepper sprays the creature and sounds a panic alarm before passing out. She awakens to a police officer knocking on the door of the RV. As she exits the RV, she hears a screeching noise; the officer tells her to look straight ahead but she looks back, and sees Rick's eviscerated corpse hanging upside down from a tree, his wedding ring scratching across the metal rooftop.

In the second story, eleven-year-old Amanda is in an online chat room talking to a girl named Jessica, who is actually an online predator posing as a young girl. The night before her twelfth birthday, her parents to a parent-teacher conference and rely on her teenage sister Katherine to stay with her. Katherine leaves to go meet her boyfriend, leaving Amanda alone.  Later on while searching the garage to find her dog the lights go out, and she becomes anxious and feels as though there is someone else in her house. After finding out that her sister Katherine has just returned home, Amanda heads back to her room. Seeing what looks like her dog under the bed, she lies down and  puts her hand down to allow it to be licked by the dog. While looking in the mirror Amanda sees the phrase "People can lick too" and the man licking her hand. She runs to Katherine's room telling her to call 911. Katherine enters Amanda's room, finds the corpse of the family dog underneath Amanda's bed, and the window open.

In the third story, Scott is riding his motorcycle through the country and it gives out on him. He notices a rural farmhouse and seeks shelter there during a rainstorm. Inside is a beautiful mute woman named Heather; she communicates with Scott by writing on a handheld chalkboard, and invites him to stay the night. During the night, they are disturbed when her father, a rancher, arrives. Scott hears a commotion downstairs, and runs to the kitchen, where he sees two bloodied bodies, and witnesses Heather's father throwing a woman's severed head into the well outside. He finds Heather unharmed, and she insists they leave the house. On the chalkboard, she writes that there are ghosts there. Suddenly, they are confronted by her father, who attacks Scott with an axe. They flee from the house, and as they leave, he passes by Heather's father, who walks toward the front door and enters the house, as if in a time loop. Scott and Heather ride away on his motorcycle, and spend the night under a willow tree. In the morning, he removes the locket from her neck and opens it; inside is a photo of them both, dressed in old-fashioned clothing. As Heather awakens, a wound appears across her neck, and her head falls into his lap.

After each of the friends have told a story, Cliff decides to return to the road and sees that the police have stopped at the site of their car accident. Suddenly, Lauren, Eric, and Alex vanish, and their campfire disappears from the church. When Cliff returns to the road, he sees himself near the wreckage of his car and an RV, surrounded by paramedics who are attempting to revive him. Lauren, Eric, and Alex are lying dead on stretchers. The RV drivers are Rick and Valerie from the first story; Scott and Heather, from the third, are paramedics attempting to revive Cliff. The attempts to resuscitate him fail, and Cliff dies. Later on, as the paramedics clean up, a car approaches the scene of the accident, with a hook emerging from the open window.

Cast

The Hook
Amy Smart as Jenny
James Marsden as Eddie

The Campfire
Jay R. Ferguson as Cliff
Christine Taylor as Lauren
Christopher Masterson as Eric
Kim Murphy as Alex

The Honeymoon
Ron Livingston as Rick
Jennifer Macdonald as Valerie
Hawthorne James as Cole

People Can Lick Too
Alex McKenna as Amanda
Devon Odessa as Katherine
Jonathan Fuller as 'Jessica' / Internet Man

The Locket
Glenn Quinn as Scott Anderson
Jacinda Barrett as Heather Wallace
Denny Arnold as Heather's father

Production
Writer and co-director Martin Kunert and producer Eric Manes had known one another while both film students at New York University, and collaborated to make Campfire Tales as their debut feature. According to writer and acquaintance Skip Press, Kunert and Manes "did whatever it took" to get the film made. The working titles for the film included Fear and All American Campfire Horror Stories.

It featured the film debut of Australian actress Jacinda Barrett, playing a mute woman in the third segment. She had previously appeared on The Real World: London in 1995.

Release

Critical response
Donald Munro and Rick Bentley of The Fresno Bee awarded the film a B-rating, writing: "None of the short stories are masterpieces, but they offer plenty of moments to make you jump."

AllMovie awarded the film a two out of five star-rating. Steve O’Brien of SFX magazine gave the film a negative review in June 1997, writing, "It’s difficult to imagine why anyone would want to watch a sanitised slasher movie such as this, especially when so few of these loathsome kids actually die." Australian paper The Age labelled it a "procession of competent but conventional creepiness" in their September 1997 review. In his 2011 book Horror Films of the 1990s, John Kenneth Muir writes that "This is the second 1990s horror anthology entitled Campfire Tales, and like the other, unrelated film from 1991, it involves horrific vignettes recounted from a campfire. Also, like the other Campfire Tales, this one deserves to be a little less obscure than it is. Filmed at the height of the slasher revival, it features smart, late-1990s teens countenancing several tales of horror, one of which involves them too." He concludes by stating that "Campfire Tales is a modest but enjoyable effort. The stories don't try to do too much, and don't rely on special effects."

Dread Central reviewer Steve Barton wrote: "Each of these stories is well written and slickly directed. The troop behind the film — Matt Cooper, Eric Manes, and Martin Kunert — are horror fans that know how to get the job done. Other films that have tried to capitalize on the whole handed-down story thing such as Urban Legend do not even come close to handling the subject matter as smartly as it is done in Campfire Tales. Honestly, there are twists, turns, and twist endings with enough energy for two films to be found here, none of which feels tacked on or forced." Film and cultural critic Michael Wilson noted the film as an homage to Dead of Night (1945). Similarly, film scholar Mikel Koven called it "noteworthy" for its unusual narrative structure. Richard Scheib of the Science Fiction, Horror and Fantasy Film Review gave the movie three and a half stars and wrote: "The film received little genre press and it was released direct to video (although the end credits reveal that it was originally intended for theatrical release). All of which usually spells low-budget independent horror film. The surprise about all of this is what a good little film Campfire Tales actually is. Occasionally, it has an over-earnest enthusiasm about it but the episodes are all written with originality and intelligence."

Website Rivers of Grue wrote of the film: "Campfire Tales. It’s just a little sterile when all is said and done."
Kevin Matthews from For It Is Man's Number gave the film six out of ten and stated: "It's not a bad little movie but there are better urban legends to choose from and better ways to showcase the material."

Home media
The film was released direct-to-video in overseas countries by Initial Entertainment Group, first on May 16, 1997 in the United Kingdom, and then on June 13, 1997 in Germany. In Australia, it was released during September 1997 by Eagle Entertainment and Time Life Video. Campfire Tales was intended to be released theatrically in America in 1997, with the film attracting interest from Warner Bros. and Paramount, who nearly gave it a wide release to 2,000 theaters following the success of Scream. The theatrical distribution deals never eventuated, with New Line Home Entertainment later acquiring the North American rights to Campfire Tales, releasing it on VHS in the United States and Canada on September 22, 1998. Promotional material from 1998 compared Campfire Tales to the Scream series and I Know What You Did Last Summer, despite the fact the film itself had been conceived prior to both of these.

It subsequently received a release on DVD by New Line on August 30, 2005. Beginning on May 12, 2015, the film was briefly made available for digital streaming by the Warner Bros. Digital Distribution branch, in addition to being re-released on DVD in North America as part of the Warner Archive Collection. It was re-released on DVD in Germany on August 8, 2020, after being out of print for several years in Europe. The reissue used the original 1997 German VHS artwork, and was limited to 1000 copies.

Legacy
The 2003 Bollywood horror film Darna Mana Hai was loosely based on the 1997 version of Campfire Tales.

In 2019, Den of Geek included it on their list of "12 Underrated Scream-Inspired Horror Movies of the Late 90s", commenting that the film had a "smart script" and had garnered a cult following.

In 2021, Dread Central included it on their list of "10 Scream-Inspired Slashers We Fully Forgot About". They labelled it a "semi-forgotten 1997 horror anthology put out by New Line Cinema about ten minutes after the release of Scream", adding that "It’s not a slasher per se, but everything about this urban legend horror moment reeks of post-Scream panic. That said, it’s great [...] It stars a bunch of people who have since become famous, including Christine Taylor, Ron Livingston, Amy Smart and James Marsden. While some of the entries in this anthology are better than others, it’s still an unmissable late-90s classic."

References

Sources

External links
 

1997 horror films
1997 films
American horror anthology films
Films based on urban legends
1990s English-language films
1990s American films